The Hawke's Bay Rugby Union (HBRU) is the governing body of rugby union in the Hawke's Bay region of New Zealand. The union is based in Napier.

The Hawke's Bay representative team are nicknamed The Magpies.

History

The Hawke's Bay Rugby Union was founded in 1884. This makes it the oldest Provincial Rugby Union outside the four main centres. Hawke's Bay has a very good Ranfurly Shield record with 24 defences from 1922 to 1927, 21 successful defences between 1966 and 1969 as well as 2 defences in 1934. Hawke's Bay won the shield again, claiming it from Otago, on 1 September 2013. They lost the shield soon after to Counties-Manukau, before winning it back from them in August 2014. Hawke's Bay's glory days as a rugby union came long before the NPC was founded. As such Hawke's Bay does not have a very flattering record in either that competition or the Air New Zealand Cup. The best position they have managed in either is 3rd. Hawke's Bay dominated the second division of the NPC in the 1990s before the Air New Zealand Cup was set up in 2006.

In 1996, Hawke's Bay and Manawatu merged their teams to form the Central Vikings. It was an attempt to elevate the unions back to the then first division. Players including Mark "Bull" Allen, Christian Cullen, Mark Ranby, Stephen Bachop and Roger Randle featured in the team. The 1997 season saw Central finish overall second with 6 wins, 2 losses and into the semi-finals. In the semi-final, the Vikings avenged their loss to Bay of Plenty in round robin play to face Northland in the final. Northland won the final 63–10. Northland were thus promoted to the First Division. However, had the Vikings won, they would not have been eligible to be promoted. 1998 saw a repeat of form for the Vikings who went unbeaten in the season. They subsequently won the final against Bay of Plenty at McLean Park, Napier and were promoted to First Division. However, due to financial issues, the merger split back to Hawke's Bay and Manawatu. Both unions subsequently became foundation unions of the Air New Zealand Cup which started in 2006.

In the past, Hawke's Bay has produced some great All Blacks, including Kel Tremain and George Nēpia. Hawke's Bay also defeated the 1993 British Lions and in 1994 defeated France (who beat the All Blacks twice in that same tour).

Super Rugby application
In 2009, Hawke's Bay announced they intended to apply to join the Super Rugby competition, when it was announced a fifteenth franchise was to be created.  However, in August 2009 the club's chairman Richard Hunt announced they were withdrawing their bid because they had not had sufficient time to present a business plan. He insisted the club remained very serious about joining the club in the future. Hawke's Bay would be New Zealand's sixth team if they were to join Super Rugby. With the announcement that New Zealand might receive a 6th Super Franchise in the SANZAAR Super Rugby competition beginning 2016, the Hawke's Bay Union announced its interest in forming this franchise together with Manawatu, therefore effectively resurrecting the Central Vikings brand as a Super Rugby franchise.

Club rugby

Clubs

Format

After the 2019 club rugby season, changes to the two highest divisions of men's club rugby in Hawke's Bay were announced. Because the first round of the club rugby season of 2020 was cancelled due to the COVID-19 pandemic, these changes only took effect in 2021.

The new format is as follows. In the first round of the season, ten Premier teams play for the Nash Cup. Only the top eight sides from the Nash Cup will play in the second round for the Maddison Trophy. The two lowest ranked Nash Cup teams will play in a modified Division 1 competition for the new Hepa Paewai Memorial Trophy, along with the six best teams of the round 1 Town & Country competition (two of five Country teams, four of 12 Town teams).

At the end of the second round, the two clubs that reach the Division 1 final will earn promotion to the following year's Nash Cup, unless those clubs already have a Premier team in the Nash Cup competition. In that situation, the promotion goes to one or both of the beaten semi-finalists (if eligible themselves). In case two beaten semi-finalists are in contention for one spot in the Nash Cup competition, the winner of the earlier round-robin match between the two clubs will earn the promotion.

The new format doesn't only introduce the new Hepa Paewai Memorial Trophy for Division 1, but also sees the introduction of a new trophy for Division 2, the Tom Mulligan Cup.

There are no changes to the format of the women's, division 3 and colts' competitions.

2022 Format variation

Due to the ongoing effects of the COVID-19 pandemic, the start of the 2022 club rugby season was delayed by almost a month. As a result, for the 2022 season, some changes were made to the new club rugby format introduced in 2021.

In the premiers grade, there is only one round in which eleven teams play 5 home and 5 away matches over 12 weeks of round robin, including one bye-weekend. The highest ranked team at the end of the round robin wins the Nash Cup. The round robin will be followed by quarter-finals, semi-finals and a final to be played by the eight highest ranked teams after the round robin. The winner of the final wins the Maddison Trophy. The club finishing last after the round robin, will be relegated to the Town & Country grade for the 2023 season.

There are some less significant changes to other grades of club rugby.

Competition winners

Round one champions:
2022 Nash Cup (Premier): Napier Tech Old Boys Rugby Club
2022 Town & Country: Bridge Pa Rugby (Town grade - Jack Swain Cup) and Otane Sports Club (Country grade - Arthur Bowman Cup)
2022 Maury Cody Cup (Division 3): Clive Rugby and Sports Club
2022 Marsh Cup (Women's grade): Taratech (Taradale and Napier Tech combination team)
2022 Arthur Brown Cup (Colts): Clive Rugby and Sports Club 

Round two champions:
2022 Maddison Trophy (Premier): Taradale Rugby & Sports Club
2022 Hepa Paewai Memorial Trophy (Division 1): Maori Agricultural College (MAC) Sports Association
2022 Tom Mulligan Cup (Division 2): Hastings Rugby and Sports Club 
2022 Ron Parker Memorial Cup (Division 3): not played for
2022 Championship Cup (Women's grade): Taratech (Taradale and Napier Tech combination team)
2022 Pat Ryan Memorial Trophy (Colts): Napier Tech Old Boys Rugby Club

U85kg
2022 (inaugural) U85kg club competition winners: Havelock North Rugby Club

School rugby
The Hawke's Bay Rugby Union administers a secondary schools rugby competition, consisting of several boys' grades and two girls' grades. The strongest boys' schools teams, however, compete in interregional competitions. The two best Hawke's Bay rugby schools, Hastings Boys' High School and Napier Boys' High School, compete in the Super 8 competition in multiple grades, while Lindisfarne College and St John's College, Hastings currently participate in the Central North Island 1st XV competition.

Napier Boys High School 1st XV won the Super 8 in 2000, 2002, 2003 and most recently made the Final in 2018. Hastings Boys High School 1st XV won the competition in 2004, 2016, shared the title with Hamilton Boys' High School in 2017, and most recently reached the Final in 2021.

Both schools also regularly feature in the (seeded) semi-finals to be played against the winner and runner-up of the Wellington Premiership school rugby competition for the Hurricanes Cup. The winner of the Hurricanes Cup represents the Hurricanes region in the  National First XV Championship or Top 4. In the most recent years, the Hurricanes Cup was won by a Hawke's Bay 1st XV team: in 2016, 2017 and 2019 by Hastings Boys High School and in 2018 and 2021 by Napier Boys High School. Due to the COVID-19 pandemic, the Hurricanes Cup and Top 4 were not played for in 2020; the Top 4 has also been cancelled for 2021.

Hawke's Bay in Air New Zealand Cup
Hawke's Bay made their debut, along with Tasman, Manawatu and Counties-Manukau, in the 2006 Air New Zealand Cup which had 14 teams. Hawkes Bay made their best effort to date in the 2007 Air New Zealand Cup, winning many games even against bigger unions such as Wellington and Waikato. They were the fairytale story of the competition, surprising everyone to reach the semi-finals where they were beaten by Auckland. They repeated this form in the 2008 and 2009 seasons where they were again beaten semi-finalists. This form in back to back seasons attracted warranted attention and many Hawke's Bay players were awarded with Super 14 contracts, both for the Hurricanes and elsewhere.

Bunnings NPC

Hawke's Bay All Black players 2020s  
Brodie Retallick 2012–
Brad Weber 2015, 2019–
Folau Fakatava 2022–

Records

Most appearances
158 – Neil Thimbleby 1959–71
147 – Hunt R.J. (Richard) 1967–83
125 – Hunter R.P. (Robbie) 1971–82
120 – Stuart R.L. (Robbie) 1967–80
111 – Crawford O. (Orcades) 1988–2000
108 – Davis W.L. (Bill) 1961–71
100 – Crawford K.K. (Karaan) 1964–71
100 – Paewai M.R. (Murdoch) 1991–2003
100 - Ahipene V.C (Victim) 1960 - 1972

Most points
1007 – J.B. (Jarod) Cunningham 1990–98
631 – Bishop I.R. (Ian) 1963–72
628 - Ihaia West 2012-2017
435 – Small A.G. (Tony) 1957–65
386 – O'Shaughnessy P.G. (Peter) 1981–90
343 – Cooper M.J.A (Matthew) 1985–89
339 – Bert Grenside 1919–31
311 – Hunter R.P. (Robbie) 1971–82
304 – Manawatu T.J. (Tim) 2001–03

Most tries
74 – Bert Grenside 1919–31
68 – Hunter R.P. (RobbieE) 1971–82
55 – Davis W.L. (Bill) 1961–71
50 – Tremain K.R. (Kelvin) 1962–70
45 – Cooke P.J. (Paul) 1985–89
44 – Smith D.B. (Dennis) 1964–70

Hawke's Bay All Blacks 

Snow Bowman
Cyril Brownlie
Laurie Brownlie
Maurice Brownlie
Jackie Blake
Bill Collins
Bert Cooke
Matt Cooper
Tommy Corkill
Israel Dagg
Doug Dalton
Bill Davis
Mark Donaldson
Mick Duncan
Hika Elliot
David Evans
Bryn Evans
Gareth Evans
Folau Fakatava
Ben Franks
Harry Frazer
Blair Furlong
Sam Gemmell
Bert Grenside
Zac Guildford
Norm Hewitt
Graeme Higginson
Bull Irvine
Everard Jackson
Alexander Kirkpatrick
Danny Lee
Ian MacRae
Hawea Mataira
Jim McCormick
Jack McNab
Jimmy Mill
George Nēpia
Jack Ormond
Lui Paewai
Tori Reid
Brodie Retallick
Pat Ryan
Mark Shaw
Frank Shelford
Dick Steere
Robbie Stuart
Tuna Swain
Ken Taylor
Mark Taylor
Neil Thimbleby
Hoeroa Tiopira
Kel Tremain
Brad Weber

Notes

References
.
http://www.espnscrum.com/newzealand/rugby/team/25937.html

External links

Hawke's Bay rugby (NZHistory.net.nz)

Hawke's Bay
New Zealand rugby union governing bodies
Sport in the Hawke's Bay Region
Sports organizations established in 1884
1884 establishments in New Zealand